Hengsha (横沙岛, Shanghainese: Waan So Tau) is a low-lying alluvial island at the mouth of the Yangtze River in eastern China. Together with the islands of Chongming and Changxing, it forms Chongming District, the northernmost area of the provincial-level municipality of Shanghai. Its population was 33,400 in 2008.

Name
Heng is the horizontal, rightward stroke  used in writing Chinese characters, similar in form to a dash. It is also used to mean "horizontal". It was applied to the island for the way it formerly stood athwart the mouth of the Yangtze, although time has now given it a round or heart-like shape and moved it in line with Changxing.

History
Hengsha first emerged from the Yangtze in 1858. It began to be reclaimed for agricultural purposes in 1886 or 1890. Hengsha Township was established in 1909. Under the Republic, the island carried on an active trade in grains via junk.

Hengsha was originally part of Chuansha County, which later merged into Pudong. In 1958, the island was placed under Baoshan County, as its ferries operated from the harbor of Wusong at the mouth of the Huangpu. The island's wandering was ended by the erection of a seawall and stabilization of the banks around the island. The next year, it saw a major influx of population, including boat people who were organized into fishing brigades. During the Down to the Countryside Movement, many of the sent-down youth from Shanghai travelled no further than Hengsha, where they assisted in reclamation, urban defense, and propaganda efforts.

Hengsha was named among the first set of national tourist resorts (t , s , p guójiā jí lǚyóu dùjià cūn) by Beijing in October 1992. Initial plans called for the construction of a casino, although that was cancelled. In March 2002, the Shanghai Municipal Government approved plans to develop Hengsha as an international conference center and forest park, with tree coverage over at least 70% of the island. In 2005, it was moved from the jurisdiction of Baoshan District to Chongming County.

Geography
Hengsha is located in the channel of the Yangtze River flowing south of Chongming and north of the districts of Baoshan and Pudong immediately before its entrance into the East China Sea. Hengsha is the southeasternmost of the three islands of Chongming County, separated from Changxing to its west by the Hengsha Xiaogang Channel.

Land reclamation
Hengsha is the site of significant land reclamation works, with dykes constructed to its southeast in order to drain and fill approximately 100 square kilometers during the lifetime of the project.

Economy
The orchards of Hengsha are the center for Shanghai's production of citrus fruits. Other crops include rice, cotton, and rape. Both freshwater and marine fishing are practiced, principally landing two kinds of anchovy. The island is also being developed for ecotourism and high-end resorts, including an international conference center, communities of low-density luxury villas, and yacht clubs.

One of Shanghai's commercial cemeteries is located on the island and the Hengsha Xiaogang Channel is also used for sea burials and the dispersing of ashes.

Government

Hengsha is administered as a single township, also named Hengsha. This is divided into 24 villages, including one fishing village. The main settlement is at Xinmin (Xīnmín Jūwěihuì). The others are:
Xingsheng (Xìngshèng Cūn),Zengchan (Zēngchǎn Cūn),Gongping (Gōngpíng Cūn),Hongqi (Hóngqí Cūn),Dongbang (Dōngbāng Cūn),Xinbeicun (Xīnběicūn),Xinglong (Xīnglóng Cūn),Fengle (Fēnglè cūn),Xinchun (Xīnchūn Cūn),Dongxing (Dōngxìng Cūn),Xinlian (Xīnlián Cūn),Huifeng (Huìfēng Cūn),Xinyong (Xīnyǒng Cūn),Minjian (Mínjiàn Cūn),Minsheng (Mínshēng Cūn),Yongfa (Yǒngfā Cūn),Fumin (Fùmín Cūn),Yongsheng (Yǒngshèng Cūn),Donghai (Dōnghǎi Cūn),Minxing (Mínxīng Cūn),Jianghai (Jiānghǎi Cūn),Minyong (Mínyǒng Cūn),Mindong (Míndōng Cūn), andHaihong (Hǎihóng Cūn).

Infrastructure
Unlike Chongming and Changxing, Hengsha remains connected to the rest of Shanghai only by ferry service. There are plans for a small airport to be constructed.

In popular culture
Hengsha is one of the main settings of the 2011 video game Deus Ex: Human Revolution, in which it is depicted as a major metropolitan area.

See also
 Islands of Shanghai & of China

References

External links
 Chongming County's official English-language website 
  at Hudong Baike 

Islands of Shanghai
Chongming District
Township-level divisions of Shanghai